Mi amor or Mio amore (meaning "my love" respectively in Spanish and Italian) may refer to:

EPs
Mi Amor (Jin Akanishi EP), 2014
Mi amor (Miriam Bryant EP), 2019

Songs
"Mi amor" (Souf song), 2016
"Mi amore", song by Angie Martinez on Up Close and Personal, 2001
"Mi amore", song by Velvet, 2006
"Mi amore", song by Jessy Matador, 2017
”Mi Amor”, song by Nova Miller, 2020

See also
Amor (disambiguation)
Amore (disambiguation)
"I Adore Mi Amor", R&B single by group Color Me Badd, 1991
Mi Amore Cadenza, character in My Little Pony: Friendship Is Magic